Principal Takes a Holiday is an American television film that aired on ABC's The Wonderful World of Disney anthology series. The film premiered on January 4, 1998 and stars Kevin Nealon, Zachery Ty Bryan and Jessica Steen. It was directed by Robert King, who also wrote the screenplay. The story was written by Paul Wolff.

Plot
John Scaduto (Zachery Ty Bryan), a troublesome high school senior makes a deal with his parents that he will not get into any more trouble until he graduates to receive a $10,000 gift from his grandma. However, when his principal Frank Hockenberry (Kurt Fuller) is involved in an accident in a prank that he planned, he finds a homeless man named Franklin Fitz (Kevin Nealon), to act as the acting principal to keep his parents and every one else none the wiser. While acting as principal, Franklin falls for Celia Shine (Jessica Steen), a fellow teacher.

Meanwhile, Peter Heath (Rashaan H. Nall) a new student, gets involved with John's plan in order for John to help him get a date with his crush Roxanne (Emmanuelle Chriqui).

Cast
 Kevin Nealon as Franklin Fitz
 Zachery Ty Bryan as John Scaduto
 Jessica Steen as Celia Shine
 Rashaan H. Nall as Peter Heath
 Kurt Fuller as Frank Hockenberry
 Ellie Harvie as Miss W. Fassle
 Laurie Murdoch as Vice Principal Ralph Calder
 Emmanuelle Chriqui as Roxanne
 Carlos Jacott as Oliver
 Bill Nye as Science Teacher
 Walter Marsh Dr. Vernon Baxter

Home media
The film was released on VHS on August 15, 2000.

References

External links

American television films
American teen comedy films
Films scored by Mark Mothersbaugh
Disney direct-to-video films
Films shot in Vancouver
1998 films
1990s American films